Soyauxia is a genus of flowering plants in the family Peridiscaceae. They are small trees or erect shrubs from wet forests of tropical West Africa. Eight specific names have been published in Soyauxia. Additional species have been discovered, but their names and descriptions will not be published until 2009 or 2010. The type species for the genus is Soyauxia gabonensis.

Soyauxia was long considered an anomaly and it has been variously classified by different authors, usually in Passifloraceae or in the defunct plant family Flacourtiaceae. The first molecular phylogenetic study to include Soyauxia placed it in Peridiscaceae. Its position within that family was determined in 2009.

Species
Soyauxia contains the following species (but this list may be incomplete or contain synonyms.):
 Soyauxia bipindensis, Gilg ex Baker f.
 Soyauxia floribunda, Hutchinson
 Soyauxia gabonensis, Oliv.
 Soyauxia glabrescens, Engler
 Soyauxia grandifolia, Gilg & Stapf
 Soyauxia ledermanii, Sleumer
 Soyauxia talbotii, Baker f.
 Soyauxia velutina, Hutchinson & Dalziel

History
The genus Soyauxia was named by Daniel Oliver in 1880, in a book whose final edition was entitled Hooker's Icones Plantarum. It was named for the German botanist and plant collector Hermann Soyaux.
Upon naming it, Oliver wrote

Oliver placed the new genus in Passifloraceae and described one species, Soyauxia gabonensis.

In 1953, John Brenan put Soyauxia in Medusandraceae, a family that he had established the year before. Brenan's classification was not generally followed by others, and John Hutchinson wrote a detailed account of why he thought that Soyauxia and Medusandra were not closely related.

In 2007, in the first comparison of DNA sequences to include Soyauxia, it was shown that Soyauxia is sister to a clade of two South American trees, Peridiscus and Whittonia. The authors recommended that Soyauxia be moved to Peridiscaceae. The position of Soyauxia within Peridiscaceae was clarified in 2009, with the inclusion of Medusandra in a phylogenetic study. In that study, it was shown that Brenan's concept of Medusandraceae is paraphyletic over Peridiscaceae sensu stricto, but that Brenan had been prescient in his perception of a relationship between Medusandra and Soyauxia. The authors recommended that Medusandra as well as Soyauxia be transferred to Peridiscaceae.

References

External links
 Soyauxia At: IPNI
 Soyauxia At:Index Nominum Genericorum At: References At: NMNH Department of Botany At: Research and Collections At: Smithsonian National Museum of Natural History

Peridiscaceae
Saxifragales genera
Taxonomy articles created by Polbot
Taxa named by Daniel Oliver